The 121st Engineer Combat Battalion was one of the first American units to land in Normandy on D-Day during World War II.

History
The 121st Engineer Combat Battalion was created in 1918 in the District of Columbia National Guard. One of its most distinguished members was General Earle G. Wheeler, who began his military career as a Private in C Company in 1926, and later rose to General (4-star) serving as Chief of Staff of the Army and later as Chairman of the Joint Chiefs of Staff.

The 121st was mobilized into Federal service in 1940 as part of the 29th Infantry Division, made up of units from Maryland, Virginia, and the District of Columbia. The 121st staged at Fort Meade, Maryland for movement to England. At the same time, the 37th Infantry Division from the Ohio National Guard, was staging at Fort Indiantown Gap, Pennsylvania.

The 37th has also been alerted for movement to England, and had sent its 112th Engineer Combat Battalion ahead as part of the advance party. Orders were changed and the 37th was diverted for service in the Pacific Theater. There was no time to recall the 112th, or to create and train a new engineer battalion. The War Department ordered all personnel and equipment of the 121st Engineers moved from Fort Meade to Fort Indiantown Gap, and the unit was redesignated the 117th Engineer Combat Battalion. One officer and six enlisted personnel, symbolically representing the 121st Headquarters, each line Company, and the Medical Detachment, remained behind with the organization's colors.

The new 117th Engineers shipped out to the Fiji Islands, and saw extensive combat in the Philippines. The men from the DC Guard worked under enemy fire building and repairing 64 bridges, destroying enemy held buildings and tank obstacles, and participating in river crossings with "consummate skill and courage."

When the 29th Division reached England the 112th Engineer Battalion from the 37th Division was redesignated and reconstituted as the 121st Engineers. By the time the 121st saw its first combat, on D-Day at Omaha Beach during the invasion of Normandy, its ranks consisted of the soldiers from Ohio as well as new soldiers from throughout the United States. None of the seven original DC National Guardsmen were with the unit at the time of the invasion.

The battalion remained active until May 1945 in operations throughout Europe.

The history, lineage and honors of the original 121st continue today in the lineage of the 372d MP Battalion of the District of Columbia Army National Guard. In 1948, a "new" 121st Engineer Battalion was established in the Maryland Army National Guard.

Although the Maryland National Guard unit carries the same name as the World War II unit, the new MDNG unit has no previous history.

D-Day landing
On 6 June 1944, the 121st Engineer Combat Battalion landed on Omaha beach in Normandy with the first American forces. The unit endured much damage to equipment and casualties among the soldiers, but after some recovery it continued to assist in the invasion. For its action during the invasion the 121st was awarded the French Croix de Guerre.

After World War II
At the end of World War II the 121st Engineer Battalion was deactivated. It was reactivated as part of its original organization, the District of Columbia Army National Guard, as the 163rd Military Police Battalion. Its history, lineage and honors continue today in the DCARNG's 372nd Military Police Battalion.

In 1948, a new 121st Engineer Battalion was activated in the Maryland National Guard. This unit carries the designation of the old 121st Engineers, but has no historical link to that organization. The new battalion played a pivotal role in the crowd control efforts after being called in to assist the local authorities during the race riots that took place in Baltimore and Cambridge in the 1960s.

See also
Coats of arms of U.S. Engineer Battalions

References

External links
Whong, Chris. "121st engineer Battalion." Available from United States Army. (Retrieved 23 November 2007)
Peterson, John. Into the Cauldron. Maryland: Clavier House, 1973.

1918 establishments in the United States
121
Maryland National Guard
Military units and formations in Maryland
Military units and formations established in 1918
Military units and formations of the United States Army in World War II